Olenya Bay or Olenya Guba is a bay of the Barents Sea on the Kola Peninsula in the Murmansk Oblast, Russia. It is an extension of the Kola Inlet, which opens out to the north into the Barents Sea. The Pechenga River discharges into the bay.

A Russian naval, formerly Soviet, base is located on the shores of the bay. It is part of the naval installation at Gadzhievo (also known as Skalisty) in the Murmansk Oblast, and is home port to submarine units of Russia's Northern Fleet. In May 2019 satellite views of the base taken from Google maps were republished noting pens that suggested military use of cetaceans there, including possibly a tame beluga whale discovered in Northern Norway what has been dubbed Hvaldimir.

References

External links
 Northern Fleet: Naval Facilities near Murmansk, Murmansk Oblast

Bays of the Barents Sea
Bays of Murmansk Oblast
Russian and Soviet Navy bases